Rajabli is an Azerbaijani surname. Notable people with the surname include: 

Ahad Rajabli (1962–2013), Azerbaijan sambo champion
Ahmed Rajabli (1898–1963), Azerbaijani and Soviet agronomist, geneticist, pedagogue, and professor

Azerbaijani-language surnames